The men's sanda 60 kilograms competition at the 2014 Asian Games in Incheon, South Korea was held from 20 September to 24 September at the Ganghwa Dolmens Gymnasium.

Sanda is an unsanctioned fight is a Chinese self-defense system and combat sport. Amateur Sanda allows kicks, punches, knees (not to the head), and throws.

A total of sixteen competitors from sixteen countries competed in this event, limited to fighters whose body weight was less than 60 kilograms.

Kong Hongxing from China won the gold medal after beating Jean Claude Saclag of the Philippines in gold medal bout 2–0, Kong won both periods by the same score of 5–0. The bronze medal was shared by Narender Grewal from India and Kang Yeong-sik of South Korea.

Schedule
All times are Korea Standard Time (UTC+09:00)

Results
Legend
TV — Technical victory

References

External links
Official website

Men's sanda 60 kg